Rishi is a 2001 Indian Tamil-language action thriller film written and directed by Sundar C. The film stars Sarath Kumar, Meena and Sanghavi, while Prakash Raj, Arun Pandian, Devan, Ramesh Khanna, and S. S. Rajendran play supporting roles. The film has music scored by Yuvan Shankar Raja, cinematography by U. K. Senthil Kumar, and editing by P. Sai Suresh. The film released on 16 February 2001.

Plot 
Rishi (Sarath Kumar) is a tough, suave, professional thief who is the right-hand of Satyan (Arun Pandian), the underworld kingpin. On one of Rishi's missions, he happens to watch Minister Devaraj (Devan) kill Hema (Bhuvaneswari), a TV reporter who is about to expose him. Before dying, Hema hands a floppy to Rishi. Rishi neither bothers about the floppy nor the murder, but Devaraj wants the floppy back. Things get confusing because of Velu (Sarath Kumar), who looks like Rishi and gets into trouble. Velu is the opposite of Rishi: he is simple-minded, takes life easy, and works for a moneylender. The "seth" lends money for buying cars, and Velu, with his friend Cheenu (Ramesh Khanna), persuades errant customers to either repay dues or part with their cars.

Complications arise when the paths of the duo cross, for Rishi and Velu are lookalikes. Only Indu (Meena), a salesgirl, seems to have some family to speak of.

The narration moves smoothly forward with Rishi and Velu leading their own lives, then their paths cross. One is mistaken for the other, and complications arise. The underworld guns for Velu. Indu, who becomes Velu's girlfriend, sees Rishi with Nandini and berates Velu for his duplicity.

Meanwhile, Rishi turns over a new leaf when one of his tasks ends up in a singer Nandhini (Sanghavi) being blinded. He saves her life, finances for her eye operation, and turns her protector, knowing fully well that she could identify him and the rest of the gang. He even parts ways with Satyan on the issue, but the latter is unwilling to let him go.

Velu is puzzled when he is attacked by a gang who demands the floppy from him. When Indu accuses him of having an affair with a girl she sees him in the hospital with, Velu visits the hospital and encounters Rishi. The duo strikes a good rapport. The puzzle pieces fall in place. Devaraj, realizing that his ministerial position is shaky, kidnaps Nandini and blackmails Rishi to kill the Chief Minister (S. S. Rajendran), but Velu goes in his place. The scene where he tries to warn the security personnel about the assassination attempt, only to find that they too are part of the conspiracy is taken straight from a Hollywood film.

The movie ends rather abruptly, with Velu being shot and the Chief Minister's life being saved.

Cast 

Sarath Kumar as Velu and Rishi (dual role)
Meena as Indhu
Sanghavi as Nandhini
S. S. Rajendran as Chief Minister
Prakash Raj as Inspector Shakthivel
Arun Pandian as Sathya
Devan as Minister Devaraj
Ramesh Khanna as Cheenu (Velu's friend)
Bhuvaneswari as Hema
S. Ve. Shekher
Madhan Bob
Thalapathy Dinesh
Crane Manohar

Production
The film was initially titled as Sri Ramajayam but ran into production trouble, before retitled and relaunched as Rishi. The film was shot in Chennai and song sequences were shot in Switzerland. During the making of the film, there were reports that the film had a similar storyline to another Tamil film which was in production, Citizen (2001). But the movie borrowed liberally from another Hollywood movie Nick of Time

Soundtrack 

The film score and soundtrack were composed by Yuvan Shankar Raja, who teamed up with Sundar C. for the second time after Unakkaga Ellam Unakkaga. The soundtrack released on 6 October 2000 and features 6 tracks overall with lyrics penned by Palani Bharathi, Pa. Vijay and producer Panchu Arunachalam. The song "Vaa Vaa Poove Vaa" was a huge chartbuster.

References

External links 
 
 

2001 films
Films scored by Yuvan Shankar Raja
Films directed by Sundar C.
2000s Tamil-language films
Indian action films
2001 action films